Trinity High School is a public high school located in Trinity, North Carolina. The school serves about 870 students in grades 9 to 12 in the Randolph County Schools district.

Notable alumni
 Bobby Labonte, stock car racing driver and NASCAR Hall of Fame inductee
 Adam Petty, stock car racing driver
 Brian Vickers, stock car racing driver

References

Educational institutions in the United States with year of establishment missing
Public high schools in North Carolina
Schools in Randolph County, North Carolina